Timbuk may refer to:

Timbuk Tu; see Timbuktu, a town in Mali in West Africa
Timbuk 3; see Timbuk3, American post-punk band
Greetings from Timbuk 3, a 1986 Timbuk3 album
Timbuk: The Last Runaway Slave; see List of In Living Color sketches